Klaus Steinbach (born 14 December 1953 in Kleve, North Rhine-Westphalia) is a former World Record holding and Olympic freestyle swimmer from Germany. He swam for Germany at the 1972 and 1976 Olympics.

At the '72 Games, he was a member of West Germany's silver medal winning 4×200 m freestyle relay. At the '76 Games, he was part of West Germany's bronze medal winning 4×100 m medley relay. He also has a one individual bronze medal and six relay medals from the World Aquatics Championships between 1973 and 1978.

Steinbach was the first man under 50 seconds on 100 m freestyle in a short course meters pool.

He also served as Germany's Chef de Mission for the 2004 and 2006 Olympics.

References

1953 births
Living people
People from Kleve
Sportspeople from Düsseldorf (region)
German male swimmers
Swimmers at the 1972 Summer Olympics
Swimmers at the 1976 Summer Olympics
Olympic swimmers of West Germany
World record setters in swimming
Olympic bronze medalists in swimming
German male freestyle swimmers
World Aquatics Championships medalists in swimming
European Aquatics Championships medalists in swimming
Medalists at the 1976 Summer Olympics
Medalists at the 1972 Summer Olympics
Olympic silver medalists for West Germany
Olympic bronze medalists for West Germany
Olympic silver medalists in swimming
Universiade medalists in swimming
Universiade bronze medalists for West Germany
Medalists at the 1977 Summer Universiade
Recipients of the Saarland Order of Merit